Morelet's seedeater (Sporophila morelleti) is a passerine bird in the typical seedeater genus Sporophila.

Taxonomy
This species was formerly considered conspecific with the cinnamon-rumped seedeater (Sporophila torqueola), with the combined species known as white-collared seedeater. However, with the discovery that cinnamon-rumped and Morelet's are deeply divergent from one another genetically, don't intergrade, and aren't even each other's closest relatives within the genus, they are now treated as separate species.

Distribution and habitat
It ranges from a small area along the Rio Grande near San Ignacio, Texas in the United States south through eastern Mexico and Central America to Panama. It mainly inhabits tropical and subtropical grasslands, savannas, and shrublands but can also be found in pastures, arable land, and heavily degraded former forests.

Foraging
The Morelet's seedeater eats mainly seeds and insects, and occasionally berries. It often forages on herbaceous plants, and less often on the ground. In captivity, it drinks and bathes often, but in the wild no drinking was observed, even though more than 300 hours of field notes were taken.

References

Further reading

Book
  Eitniear, J. C. 1997. White-collared Seedeater (Sporophila torqueola). In The Birds of North America, No. 278 (A. Poole and F. Gill, eds.). The Academy of Natural Sciences, Philadelphia, PA, and The American Ornithologists’ Union, Washington, D.C.

Articles
 Azpiroz AB. (2003). First records of the White-collared Seedeater (Sporophila zelichi) for Uruguay. Ornitologia Neotropical. vol 14, no 1. p. 117-119.
 Bencke GA. (2004). The seedeater Sporophila zelichi observed in Rio Grande do Sul, Brazil. Ararajuba. vol 12, no 2. p. 170-171.
 Eitniear JC. (1997). White collared seedeater: Sporophila torqueola. Birds of North America. vol 0, no 278. p. 1-12.
 Eitniear JC. (2004). Diet of the white-collared seedeater Sporophila torqueola (Passeriformes: Emberizidae) in Texas. Texas Journal of Science. vol 56, no 1. p. 77-81.
 Woodin MC, Skoruppa MK, Blacklock GW & Hickman GC. (1999). Discovery of a second population of white-collared seedeaters, Sporophila torqueola (Passeriformes: Emberizidae) along the Rio Grande of Texas. Southwestern Naturalist. vol 44, no 4. p. 535-538.

Morelet's seedeater
Birds of El Salvador
Birds of Central America
Birds of Belize
Birds of Guatemala
Birds of Nicaragua
Birds of Panama
Birds of Mexico
Birds of the Rio Grande valleys
Birds described in 1850
Taxa named by Charles Lucien Bonaparte